Stephanie Williams may refer to:

 Stephanie Williams (Miss District of Columbia) (born 1987), Miss District of Columbia, 2010
 Stephanie Williams (dancer), Australian ballet dancer
 Stephanie Williams (Welsh footballer) (born 1992), Welsh footballer
 Stephanie Williams (Australian footballer) (born 2002), Australian rules footballer
 Stephanie E. Williams (born 1957), actress
 Stephanie Turco Williams, United States diplomat specialising in the Arab world